Allen Midgette (born as Allen Joseph Midgett; February 2, 1939 – June 16, 2021) was an American actor and painter who is perhaps best known for playing Andy Warhol on a 1968 University lecture tour after the artist was shot by Valerie Solanas. He was eventually eventfully found out.

Early life and career 
Midgett was born in Camden, New Jersey, the son of Dorothy (Jones) and Jarvis Midgett, who was a ship captain and harbor master. Prior to his role imitating Warhol, Midgette appeared in two French New Wave influenced avant-garde Italian films by Bernardo Bertolucci, the then 21 year old's 1962 directorial debut La commare secca (based on a story by Pier Paolo Pasolini for whom Bertolucci was previously an assistant) and Before the Revolution (1964). Midgette was also an extra in the 1961 film version of West Side Story.  

Midgette was a Warhol superstar and appeared in two of Andy's films, The Nude Restaurant (1967) and Lonesome Cowboys (1968). He later appeared in another Bertolucci movie, 1900 (1976), in the role of Vagabond, which, Midgette related, the director wrote specifically for him.

Midgette died on June 16, 2021, in Woodstock, New York at the age of 82.

References

External links

1939 births
2021 deaths
Male actors from New Jersey
Andy Warhol
People from Camden, New Jersey